Belgacem Bouguenna is a Tunisian singer and teacher, born in Douz (Kebili).

Discography
 El Walda ( Mother.)
 El Ghorba (Exile.)
 Fatma (His lover's name.)
 Wras 3youni (I swear on my eyes.)

References

External links
  Belgacem Bouguenna blog
  Bouguenna songs

21st-century Tunisian male singers
Living people
Year of birth missing (living people)
People from Kebili Governorate